Leslie Pietrzyk is an American author who has three traditionally published novels, Pears on a Willow Tree, A Year and a Day, and  Silver Girl. Her historical novel, Reversing the River, set in Chicago on the first day of 1900, was serialized on the literary app, Great Jones Street.

Career 
Her short fiction has appeared in The Gettysburg Review, The Iowa Review, New England Review, The Sun, Ploughshares, River Styx, The Washington Post Journal, TriQuarterly, and Shenandoah.

She holds a B.A. in English/Creative Writing from Northwestern University and an M.F.A. in creative writing from American University.  She lives in Alexandria, Virginia, and teaches in the Masters in Writing program at Johns Hopkins University as well as the Low-Res MFA program at Converse College in Spartanburg, South Carolina.

Pietrzyk is also the founder and editor of Redux, an online journal featuring previously published work.

Awards and honors
 Her short story collection, This Angel on My Chest., won the 2015 Drue Heinz Literature Prize. 
 Other awards include residencies to Hawthornden Castle, the Wolff Cottage in Fairhope (AL), Writer in Residence at ARGS, Virginia Center for Creative Arts, Kimmel Harding Nelson Center, and The Hambidge Center. 
 Short story awards include the Jeanne Charpiot Goodheart Prize for Fiction from Shenandoah and the Chris O’Malley Fiction Prize from Madison Review.

Works 
 Pears on a Willow Tree,  New York, NY Bard 1998. , 
A Year and a Day: a Novel, New York : William Morrow, 2003. , 
 This Angel on My Chest : stories,  Pittsburgh, PA : University of Pittsburgh Press, 2015. , 
 Silver Girl, Los Angeles, CA: Unnamed Press, 2018. ,

References

External links
 Official website
 Redux Literary Journal

Living people
Year of birth missing (living people)
21st-century American novelists
21st-century American women writers
21st-century American short story writers
American University alumni
Northwestern University alumni
American women novelists
American women short story writers
Writers from Alexandria, Virginia
Johns Hopkins University faculty
Novelists from Virginia
Novelists from Maryland
American women academics